A Dal 2020 was the ninth season of Hungarian music contest A Dal, held between 1 February and 7 March 2020 at the Studio 1 of MTVA in Budapest, Hungary. This season was the first one in the history of the show not to be used as 's national selection for the Eurovision Song Contest, as the broadcaster decided not to participate in the  contest. While various media speculated that this move was related to the rise of anti-LGBT+ sentiment among the leadership of Hungary and the broadcaster itself, no official reasons were cited by the organizers or the broadcaster. MTVA did however deny that the withdrawal was in any way related to that. Regarding A Dal, the broadcaster decided to renew the show in 2020, explaining that the focus was now on 'supporting talented musicians from the Hungarian pop scene.'

Format 
As usual, the competition consisted of 30 entries competing in three heats, two semi-finals, and a final. The hosts for all the shows were Lili Rókusfalvy and, for the third year in a row, Hungary's 2016 Eurovision representative Freddie. All shows were broadcast from 19:35 CET on Duna.

In the semifinals and the final, the artists were allowed to choose between performing with live instrumentation or a backing track.

The voting in all rounds before the final underwent some changes for 2020, giving a lot more power to the televote (as the jury–televote ratio is now a 50:50 split). After each performance, every individual jury awarded a score from 1 to 10 to the act. They can only give one set of 10 points per show and if an act gets 10 points from all four judges (40 points in total) they advance automatically to the next stage of the show. Then, after all performances are over, the phone lines will open for ten minutes and viewers will be able to call or send an SMS (up to 25 times per show) in order to vote for their favorite entries. When the voting closes, the act with the fewest votes will be automatically eliminated regardless of how the jury voted. The jury will then eliminate another act by themselves, independently of the public vote. The voting opens again for the eight remaining acts and their votes will be converted to the same format as the jury votes with the top entries (six in the heats and four in the semi-finals) qualifying to the next stage. The final had the same voting format as usual, though: the jury voted after all performances giving scores to their top 4 (4, 6, 8 and 10 points). These top 4 acts would go on to a second round where the public vote decided the winner of A Dal 2020.

The four jury members were:

 Bence Apáti: Hungarian ballet dancer, publicist, director of the Budapest Operetta Theater
 Feró Nagy: singer-songwriter, frontman of Beatrice and Ős-Bikini, judge in the first three seasons of X Factor Hungary (he mentored the winner, Csaba Vastag, in the first season)
 Barna Pély: jazz singer winner of the Artistjus award, frontman of the Hungarian rock band United, jury in the first three seasons of Megasztár
 Lilla Vincze: singer-songwriter winner of the eMeRTon award, Napoleon Boulevard, member of the Hungarian 2018 Eurovision jury

Alongside the main award of the contest (a monetary prize of HUF 75 million and promotion at the national radio station Petőfi Radio), the organization of the show awarded three extra awards in different categories during the final of the show:
 Best Discovery from A Dal 2020: Tortuga
 Best Lyrics from A Dal 2020: Dénes Pál - Készen állsz
 Best Acoustic Version: Gergő Rácz and Reni Orsovai - Mostantól

Participants 
The 30 participants, selected by an internal jury from 559 submissions, were revealed on 17 December 2019 ahead of a press conference the following day.

Shows

Heat 1

Heat 2

Heat 3

Semi-final 1

Semi-final 2

Final

Ratings

References

2020 in Hungarian television